Christopher Nathan Hamilton (commonly known as CJ Hamilton; born 23 March 1995) is an Irish footballer who plays for Blackpool as a winger. He has previously played for Sheffield United, Halifax Town, Gateshead and Mansfield Town. Born in England and raised in Ireland, he represents the Republic of Ireland in international football.

Early life
Hamilton was born in Harrow but he moved to Clonea, Waterford, Ireland, as a child. He played hurling for Clonea GAA and football for Carrick United.

Club career
Hamilton began his career with Sheffield United and spent time out on loan at Halifax Town and Gateshead in the 2015–16 season. He joined Mansfield Town in June 2016 and made his professional debut on 9 August 2016 against Blackburn Rovers in the EFL Cup.

In June 2019 he was linked with a transfer away from Mansfield. He joined Blackpool on 22 July 2020, for an undisclosed fee, on a three-year contract.

International career
Hamilton received his first call-up to the Republic of Ireland senior team on 25 May 2022 ahead of their UEFA Nations League games against Armenia, Ukraine and Scotland.

On 8 June 2022, Hamilton made his international debut for Ireland in a single-goal defeat at home to Ukraine.

Career statistics

References

External links

1995 births
Living people
Republic of Ireland association footballers
English people of Irish descent
English Football League players
Sheffield United F.C. players
Halifax Town A.F.C. players
Gateshead F.C. players
Mansfield Town F.C. players
Blackpool F.C. players
Association football wingers
Republic of Ireland international footballers